John N and Melba S Anderson Memorial Conservation Area consists of  in Crawford County, Missouri. It is located southeast of the town of Steelville and northwest of Cherryville. 

Anderson Conservation Area is forested and does not include any trails. The area is open to hunting with the appropriate permit during hunting seasons.

References

Protected areas established in 2007
Protected areas of Crawford County, Missouri
Conservation Areas of Missouri
2007 establishments in Missouri